The 2022 Russian Cup Final was the 30th Russian Cup Final, the final match of the 2021–22 Russian Cup. It was played at Luzhniki Stadium in Moscow, Russia, on 29 May 2022, contested by Spartak Moscow and Dynamo Moscow.

It was the first Russian Cup Final at Luzhniki Stadium since 2007 and in Moscow since 2008.

Pre-game
2022 Russian Cup Final was a single football match of Oldest Russian derby. The teams faced each other in the Russian Cup final for the first time. In the finals of Soviet Cup the teams played each other in 1950, Spartak Moscow won 3–0.

Match
The score was opened early by Aleksandr Sobolev. Arsen Zakharyan equalized in the second half, and then Quincy Promes scored the winning goal. Dynamo was awarded a penalty kick during stoppage time after a VAR review, but Daniil Fomin sailed it high over the crossbar.

Details

References

Russian Cup finals
Russian Cup
Cup
FC Spartak Moscow matches
FC Dynamo Moscow matches